Plan Bay Area is the long-range Regional Transportation Plan and Sustainable Communities Strategy for the nine-county San Francisco Bay Area. It is the Bay Area's implementation of the Sustainable Communities and Climate Protection Act of 2008, or SB 375, a California law that aims to integrate sustainable strategies to reduce transportation-related pollution and external greenhouse gas emissions. The plan addresses the plan identifies goals and develops strategies for transportation, land-use, and housing to accommodate the region's expected growth and needs over a long-term planning horizon. It is jointly prepared by the Metropolitan Transportation Commission (MTC) and the Association of Bay Area Governments (ABAG). The current plan, which includes projections and strategies through the year 2040, is called Play Bay Area 2040. Plan Bay Area 2050 is currently under development.

This adopted plan will invest in increasing methods of transportation with the goal of reducing  emissions. To do so, the plan will invest in extending ferry services, freeway express lanes, and developing newer BART Stations to expand travel reach.

The goal of this plan is to improve on their earlier efforts of network and growth within the context of finance and environmental responsibility. Like all plans, it is a work in progress that is updated every four years to reflect on new priorities and changes with the goal of reducing greenhouse gas emissions.

The plan was approved on July 18, 2013, by the Association of Bay Area Governments and by the Metropolitan Transportation Commission. The plan needs to be updated every four years.

Employment 
The Bay Area is home to a high concentration of knowledge-based industries, research centers and universities. It is located at one of the most famous tech clusters widely known throughout the globe as Silicon Valley. With the various industries available within the region, it does not come as a surprise that the Bay Area is also home to a highly educated and international labor market.

The Bay Area attracts highly skilled and educated individuals around the world as it is the global epicenter for advancements in technology and related knowledge-based industries. Despite this growing population and the increase access of job opportunities, there is limited housing options available.

Housing Crisis 

Due to the continual growth of companies moving into the Bay Area, there is a high demand of employment. However, there is a low supply of housing available to accommodate these workers.

Job-Housing Connection Approach 
The Job-Housing Strategy consists of addressing housing, economic development, transportation, and land conservation policies in order to support long-term growth. This strategy focuses on locally designated Priority Development Areas to attract economic potential by providing housing and increasing transportation options for the growing demand of workers. This strategy consists of four goals: 
 To create more jobs in order to stimulate and strengthen the regional economy.
 Widen the accessibility, affordability, and variety of housing available. 
 Establish a network of communities.
 Protect region's unique natural environment. 
The hope of these goals is to strengthen regional infrastructure and preserve agriculture land and natural resources.

Long-term Goals 
The final blueprint for directing all growth in the Bay Area is to reduce urban sprawl onto natural and agricultural land. Some of the highlights include the following: 
 No sprawl for 30 years. New growth will occur within existing boundaries by increasing population density. 
 Public transit will be located near 80% of new homes, as well as the projected 60% of new jobs. 
 Funds provided by the One Bay Area Grant program will go to locations that are the most sustainable and equitable developed for transportation and affordable homes.
 Natural and agricultural land will be protected and funded by the Priority Conservation Area Grant Program.

References 

Government in the San Francisco Bay Area
Sustainable transport
Environment of the San Francisco Bay Area